Cerocala is a genus of moths in the family Erebidae.

Species
 Cerocala albicornis Berio, 1966
 Cerocala albimacula Hampson, 1916
 Cerocala algiriae Oberthür, 1876
 Cerocala basilewskyi Berio, 1954
 Cerocala caelata Karsch, 1896
 Cerocala confusa Warren, 1913
 Cerocala contraria (Walker, 1865)
 Cerocala decaryi Griveaud & Viette, 1962
 Cerocala grandirena Berio, 1954
 Cerocala ilia Viette, 1973
 Cerocala illustrata Holland, 1897
 Cerocala insana Herrich-Schäffer, [1858]
 Cerocala masaica Hampson, 1913
 Cerocala mindingiensis Romieux, 1937
 Cerocala munda Druce, 1900
 Cerocala oppia (Druce, 1900)
 Cerocala orientalis de Joannis, 1912
 Cerocala ratovosoni Viette, 1973
 Cerocala rothschildi Turati, 1924
 Cerocala sana Staudinger, 1901
 Cerocala scapulosa Hübner, [1808]
 Cerocala sokotrensis Hampson, 1899
 Cerocala subrufa Griveaud & Viette, 1962
 Cerocala vermiculosa Herrich-Schäffer, 1858

References

 

Ophiusini
Moth genera